Dušan Matković (born 1 February 1999) is a Montenegrin water polo player. He competed in the 2020 Summer Olympics.

Matković was given the honour to carry the national flag of Montenegro at the closing ceremony of the 2020 Summer Olympics in Tokyo, becoming the 30th water polo player to be a flag bearer at the opening and closing ceremonies of the Olympics.

He is currently playing for CN Atlètic-Barceloneta.

Clubs 
Matković played for VK Primorac Kotor until 2022. In 2022 he transferred to CN Atlètic-Barceloneta.

See also
 Montenegro men's Olympic water polo team records and statistics
 List of flag bearers for Montenegro at the Olympics

References

1999 births
Living people
People from Kotor
Water polo players at the 2020 Summer Olympics
Montenegrin male water polo players
Olympic water polo players of Montenegro